Patelloida pygmaea is a species of sea snail, a true limpet, a marine gastropod mollusk in the family Lottiidae, one of the families of true limpets.

Description
Oval shape (eggshell shape) limpet with varying colours on the shell.  Usually spots on greyish-brown or pale-white background with regular edge.

Distribution
Distributed around Yellow Sea of Mainland China, as well as Taiwan. Living in inter-tidal area, bay area with sheltering. Often appears around places where oysters are growing.

References

External links

Lottiidae
Gastropods described in 1860